Óscar Villa may refer to:

 Óscar Villa (footballer, born 1994), Mexican football forward for Xelajú
 Óscar Villa (footballer, born 2001), Mexican football fullback for León